Viktor Mikhaylov may refer to:
 Viktor Mikhaylov (academic) (1934–2011), Russian academic and nuclear scientist
 Viktor Mikhaylov (actor) (born 1951), Russian actor
 Viktor Mikhailov (1924–2021), Soviet and Russian military officer
 Victor Mihailov (born 1981), Moldovan football coach